Kurakino is a rural locality (a village) in Nikolskoye Rural Settlement, Kaduysky District, Vologda Oblast, Russia. The population was 31 as of 2002.

Geography 
Kurakino is located 39 km northwest of Kaduy (the district's administrative centre) by road. Pimenovo is the nearest rural locality.

References 

Rural localities in Kaduysky District